Aganetha Dyck (born September 12, 1937) is a Canadian sculptor residing in Winnipeg, Manitoba. Dyck is best known for her work with live honeybees, that build honeycomb on objects that she introduces to honeybee hives. In 2007 Dyck was awarded both Manitoba's Arts Award of Distinction and Canada's Governor General's Award in Visual and Media Arts.

Personal life
Dyck was born Aganetha Rempel, in 1937, to Mennonite parents in Marquette, Manitoba, a French-Canadian farming town 50 km north of Winnipeg. She married Peter Dyck, a Mennonite merchant from Winnipeg, in 1958. The family moved to Prince Albert, Saskatchewan, in 1972 where Aganetha Dyck enrolled in art courses. At the Prince Albert Community College Dyck studied pottery, batik, Salish weaving, and art criticism.  Dyck began to crochet, and was trained in Salish weaving by a local weaver. While at Prince Albert, Dyck had the opportunity to be mentored by Professor George Glen and studied Art History. The family returned to Winnipeg in 1976. Between 1980 and 1982 Dyck studied Art History at the University of Winnipeg.

Together Aganetha and Peter Dyck have three children; Richard, Deborah and Michael.

Career
Dyck's early work is described as transforming domestic processes into fine art, thereby validating activities that are traditionally considered feminine. In her early work, Dyck used household materials such as buttons, wool fabrics, and cigarettes. Close Knit, completed between 1975 - 1981, took inspiration from a dryer accident with a piece made of wool. Various pieces of wool clothing were then intentionally shrunk for this work. A 1984 Winnipeg Art Gallery exhibition of Dyck's work featured several hundred jars of buttons prepared and cooked using different culinary techniques.

Dyck was trained to crochet in the Salish style by a weaver in Prince Albert. After accidentally felting some of her woven work, she began to design felt sculptures, such as Close Knit ((1975‑1981)), Skirt Issue (1981) and Forest (1975‑1981), as well as sculptures that combined felt art with found objects, such as 23 Suitcases (1981).

Dyck is best known for her work with honeybees, which began in 1989 when she rented beehives, and is described by her as a collaboration.  She was inspired when she came across a store sign made out of honeycomb. Dyck places objects into beehives, or beehives into objects, and allows insects to build honeycomb on the objects, sometimes over the course of years. This work is considered to be exemplified by Glass Dress: Lady in Waiting (1992‑1998), currently held at the National Gallery of Canada. The work took 10 beekeeping seasons to create. Another collaboration with bees is Hockey Night in Canada (1995 - 2000) where various pieces of sports equipment are turned into beehives. (Her work with honeybees has drawn attention from the press, and Dyck has been featured in the CBC television show The Nature of Things, with David Suzuki. Dyck has collaborated with beekeepers and entomologists in making her sculptures. In addition to appreciating the beauty of the honeycomb, Dyck hopes that "people will realize the importance of the honeybees' work."

Even as Dyck began her artistic practice by referencing the domestic objects and tasks with which she was most familiar, she continued to employ traditional signifiers of womanhood through the collaborative creation of honey-comb encrusted high heels, handbags, and even a wedding gown.

Dyck's work with bees has been featured in Troyes, Paris, Rotterdam, and at the Yorkshire Sculpture Park in England. A selection of her awards includes the Manitoba Arts Council Award of Distinction (2007), Governor General`s Award in Visual and Media Arts (2007), Winnipeg's Art City Star Award (2013), Winnipeg Art Council's Making a Mark Award (2014). Dyck's show "Collaborations" was featured at Burnaby Art Gallery 2009 In 2018, Close Knit was included in Thunderstruck: Physical Landscapes, a Canada Council exhibition about contemporary dance.

Dyck sits on the board of directors of Plug In Gallery, and has served as a mentor in Mentoring Artists for Women's Art.

The University of Manitoba Archives & Special Collections has the Aganetha Dyck Fonds. It includes textual records related to her art career, and artifacts.

Selected works
Close Knit ((1975‑1981)), Canadian Council Art Bank.
Closest to Her (2007), National Gallery of Canada.
Queen (2007), National Gallery of Canada.
Glass Dress: Lady in Waiting (1992‑1998), National Gallery of Canada.
Hive Drawing #2 (2008), Burnaby Art Gallery.

Awards
 Manitoba's Arts Award of Distinction (2007).
 Governor General's Award in Visual and Media Arts (2007).
 Spotlight on 40 years: Artwork from Canada Council Art Bank (2012).
 Art City Star Award, Winnipeg (2013).
 Making a Mark award by the Winnipeg Arts Council (2014).

Select exhibitions 

 2009 – Aganetha Dyck: Collaborations (solo), Burnaby Art Gallery, Burnaby, British Columbia, Canada.
2011 – Guest Workers (solo), Confederation Centre Art Gallery, Charlottetown, Prince Edward Island, Canada.
2014 – Surreal Transformations (two-person show with Richard Dyck), Art Gallery of Algoma, Sault Ste. Marie, Ontario, Canada.
2014 – You've Really Got a Hold on Me, Oakville Galleries, Oakville, Ontario, Canada. 
2014 – Aganetha Dyck: Honeybee Alterations, Ottawa School of Art, Ottawa, Ontario, Canada. 
2017 – Cross Pollination, 516 Arts, Albuquerque, New Mexico, USA. 
2017 – AlterNation, Kamloops Art Gallery, Kamloops, British Columbia, Canada. 
2017 – Animal Intent, apexart, New York, USA.
2019 – Displacement, Vancouver Art Gallery, Vancouver, BC.
2019 – Something More Than Nothing, The Reach Gallery Museum, Abbotsford, British Columbia, Canada, and touring to the Art Gallery at Evergreen Cultural Centre, Coquitlam, BC.

Collections 
Dyck's work is held in the collections of the National Gallery of Canada, Ottawa, ON; the Burnaby Art Gallery, Burnaby, BC; Confederation Centre Art Gallery, Charlottetown, PEI;  Dunlop Art Gallery, Regina, SK; Kelowna Art Gallery, Kelowna, BC; Oakville Galleries, Oakville, ON; Vancouver Art Gallery, Vancouver, BC; Winnipeg Art Gallery, Winnipeg, MB; Tom Thomson Memorial Art Gallery, Owen Sound, ON; Saskatchewan Arts Board, Regina, SK; Manitoba Arts Council Art Bank, Winnipeg, MB; Canada Council Art Bank, Ottawa, ON; Glenbow Museum, Calgary, AB; Art Gallery of Guelph, Guelph, ON; and the Art Gallery of Windsor, ON, amongst others.

Further reading 
Haladyn, Julian Jason. Aganetha Dyck: The Power of the Small. London, Ontario: Blue Medium Press.

References

External links 
 Aganetha Dyck's personal website

1937 births
Living people
Artists from Manitoba
Canadian women sculptors
Canadian Mennonites
Governor General's Award in Visual and Media Arts winners
People from Interlake Region, Manitoba
University of Winnipeg alumni
20th-century Canadian sculptors
20th-century Canadian women artists
21st-century Canadian sculptors
21st-century Canadian women artists
Mennonite artists